William Rodney Knowles (February 27, 1946 – October 25, 2008) was a professional basketball player who played for the Phoenix Suns and New York Nets.

College
Knowles helped lead the Davidson Wildcats to two NCAA tournament appearances in 1966 and 1968. He averaged 16.0 points per game, 10th all-time for the Wildcats. His 807 rebounds ranks 5th all-time.

References

1946 births
2008 deaths
American men's basketball players
Basketball players from North Carolina
Centers (basketball)
Davidson Wildcats men's basketball players
New York Nets players
Phoenix Suns draft picks
Phoenix Suns players